The French destroyer Panthère was a  built for the French Navy during the 1920s. Aside from cruises to the English Channel and the French West Indies, she spent her entire career in the Mediterranean Sea. The ship was assigned to the Torpedo School at Toulon in 1932 and remained there until World War II began in September 1939. She was then assigned convoy escort duties in the Atlantic and was being refitted when the Battle of France began in May 1940. After the surrender of France a month later, Panthère was reduced to reserve. When the Germans attempted to seize the French fleet there in November 1942, she was one of the few ships that was not scuttled and was captured virtually intact.

The Germans later turned her over to the Royal Italian Navy (Regia Marina) who renamed her FR 22 when they recommissioned her in early 1943. The ship was scuttled when Italy surrendered in September and scrapped after the war.

Design and description
The Chacal-class ships were designed to counter the large Italian s. They were powered by two geared steam turbines, each driving one propeller shaft, using steam provided by five du Temple boilers. During her sea trials on 20 April 1927, Panthères turbines provided  and she reached  for a single hour. Their crew consisted of 10 officers and 187 crewmen in peacetime and 12 officers and 209 enlisted men in wartime.

The main armament of the Chacal-class ships consisted of five Canon de 130 mm Modèle 1919 guns in single mounts, one superfiring pair fore and aft of the superstructure and the fifth gun abaft the aft funnel. The guns were numbered '1' to '5' from front to rear. Their anti-aircraft armament consisted of two Canon de 75 mm modèle 1924 guns in single mounts positioned amidships. The ships carried two above-water triple sets of  torpedo tubes. A pair of depth charge chutes were built into their stern; these housed a total of twenty  depth charges. They were also fitted with four depth-charge throwers for which they carried a dozen  depth charges.

Construction and career
Panthère, named after the eponymous feline, was ordered on 26 February 1923 from Arsenal de Lorient. She was laid down on 23 December 1923, once the slipway was vacated by her sister ship . Launched on 27 October 1924, commissioned on 1 November 1926, completed on 4 January 1927 and entered service a month later. Completion was delayed by problems with her propulsion machinery and late deliveries by sub-contractors. On 27 April 1927, Panthère participated in a naval review by Gaston Doumergue, President of France, off Marseilles. The ship was also present when he next reviewed the fleet on 3 July 1928 off Le Havre. On 9 October 1928, Panthère got underway from Toulon with Chacal and Tigre to search for the missing submarine .

Two months later, the ship participated in the naval review at Algiers on 10 May 1930 commemorating the centenary of the first French landing in Algeria on 13 June 1830. The four depth charge throwers were removed in 1932 and the ship was assigned to the 9th DL of the Torpedo Training School (Ecole d'application du lancement à la mer) at Toulon on 1 October 1932. About two years later, the 75-millimeter guns were replaced by four twin mounts for  anti-aircraft machineguns.

She was assigned to the Western Command (Forces maritimes de l'Ouest) for convoy escort duties from October to May 1940 where she guarded convoys traveling between Gibraltar and Brest as well as Casablanca, French Morocco, and Le Verdon-sur-Mer. In October – December, two depth-charge throwers were reinstalled, No. 3 gun removed, and her depth charge stowage reduced to a dozen 200 kg and eight 100 kg depth charges to improve her stability.

In May 1940, Panthère began a refit at Toulon that included the addition of piping between the forecastle and forward fuel tank to allow the ship to refuel at sea and the removal of the mainmast in favor of a platform with a twin-gun mount for the  light AA gun. When France surrendered on 22 June, she was still being worked on and only one propeller shaft was available. Shortly afterwards, the ship was reduced to reserve with only a skeleton crew aboard and her anti-aircraft guns were transferred to more modern ships.

On 27 November 1942, the ship was captured almost intact by the Germans when they occupied Toulon and was turned over to the Italians on 14 December. The Regia Marina redesignated her as FR 22 and she recommissioned on 19 January 1943 after Pierre Laval, head of Vichy France, agreed to transfer her on 11 January; she sailed to Taranto on 23 March where the Italians used her as a transport in Italian waters. The ship's most notable mission was when she transported former Italian Premier Benito Mussolini from Ponza Island to La Maddalena, Sardinia on 6 August. The ship was scuttled at La Spezia on 9 September 1943 following the Italian armistice and broken up after the war.

Notes

Citations

References

Chacal-class destroyers
1924 ships
Ships built in France
Naval ships of France captured by Germany during World War II
World War II destroyers of Italy
Scuttled vessels
Maritime incidents in November 1942
Maritime incidents in September 1943